was a fictitious anime which appeared in the television miniseries Densha Otoko. In the same manner as Kujibiki Unbalance, an anime that began as a fictitious anime/manga within the anime/manga Genshiken, it has been adapted into a television series, which itself was later adapted into a manga series. Originally conceptualized by Kazuya Tsurumaki, the 11-episode series was produced by Gonzo, Fuji TV, Pony Canyon and GDH and directed by Keiichiro Kawaguchi, with Junki Takegami handling series composition, okama and Takashi Kumazen designing the characters and Kousuke Yamashita composing the music. The anime first aired on January 13, 2007 on Fuji TV and ran until March 24, 2007.

Anime News Network has reported that the official pronunciation of the series' title is Getsumento Heiki Mina, not Getsumen Usagi Heiki Mina. In the Densha Otoko drama, it was named just Getsumen Heiki Mina. The Densha Otoko version of Getsumen Heiki Mina ran for 26 episodes, and the story is completely different from the real-world anime.

Story
After establishing contact with extraterrestrial civilizations, it was found that humans were the only race to develop various sports. The number of alien sports fans grew dramatically, and the most fanatic of them regularly harass stadiums for taking part in a game, or demanding a good show, etc. Finally a treaty was settled, ruling all interferences towards other planets' cultures illegal. Rabbit Force, a group of rabbit-themed henshin (transforming) girls, became responsible for enforcing the treaty and capturing any offenders.

Characters

Mina is the current announcer for "SpoLuna". Unlike many typical shōjo protagonists, Mina is a very intelligent and hardworking girl who often chooses her responsibilities over self-indulgence.

One of Mina's fellow announcers. She is a very mature and well-experienced women who is often admired for her cool demeanor. It is shown that Suirin inspired Mina's determination and her dream to become an announcer. When Suirin transforms into her alter ego; Ootsuki Miina, her calm and mature personality switches entirely. Rather, she gets too indulged in her battles and causes damage to property in the process.

Mina's other fellow announcer. Mina has a crush on him. He and Suirin have a sibling-like friendship, as well.

Onoue P

SpoLuna's producer. He was the one who picked out Kōshū and grew her to become SpoLuna's popular announcer. It is revealed later that he himself was an announcer before.

The director of SpoLuna. He gets angry with Mina when she leaves work (to become Tsukishiro Miina),arrives late, or other mistakes.

An employee at SpoLuna, his position is never discussed in the series. He's often at Kato's side, assisting him and often calming him down after Mina upsets him.

A pink-haired girl with a long bang that moves about on her head. As a running gag, the bang often expresses her emotion through its movements. Escartin despises Mina, and is always trying to sabotage her, as she is jealous of her being an announcer. Because of Miina's naive optimism, she never notices Escartin's schemes. Escartin sleeps in a secret room in the prop room. In the last episode, she becomes an announcer.

The "sister" of Kanchi (in one episode, she hints that she and Kanchi are cousins who live together). She is a cheerleader and cares very much for Kanchi but also is easily annoyed by him. She looks up to Mina, and addresses her as senpai. Her alter ego is Minazuki Miina. At first, she disliked Tsukishiro Miina; because of all the attention she inadvertently drew from Kanchi. But when she goes with Tsukishiro Miina to save him from aliens, she realizes Tsukishiro cares for Kanchi.

The "brother" of Nakoru. He is on the baseball team. He is an Otaku of Tsukishiro Miina and also has an infatuation for her.

Kanchi's hyperactive friend, he is also deeply infatuated with Tsukishiro Miina. He even created a fansite about her. But in one episode, he is shown to have created fansites about each individual Miina.

Mina's childhood friend.

A second grade-child actress. Her alter ego is Tamamushi Miina. She lives alone with her aunt because her parents are overseas due to work. When she first meets Mina, she tricks her by pretending to be a bystander who finds out Mina is a Rabbit Warrior and blackmails her for it.

A female paparazzi. She became the target of an alien snipers when she took a photo containing a terrorist alien. She holds an interest in military weaponry. Her alter ego is Satsuki Miina. She is a Rogue Miina. But during an alien attack, Nanashi returns her Miina powers.

A female background character who is shown to have multiple careers and is a Miina, as well.

A girl who origins from Planet Miina(she would be considered in alien, but is a human nonetheless). She is an intergalactic celebrity and is part of the Miina Legion; a court that chooses Miinas. She dislikes Ootsuki Miina, and ruins her reputation by making her appear to be a maniac who loves chaos. She was jealous of her for stealing her place as #1 Miina. However, she doesn't count on Mina revealing her true identity, the other Miinas taking a stand against her, or Nanashi revealing a video showing her plotting to discredit Ootsuki. She has an assistant named Yayoi. Her alter ego is Shiwasu Miina.

She is an Otaku of the Miinas from California. Her idol is Kisaragi Miina, who tells her to become a Miina she must travel to Japan and have special training. But, Tamamushi Miina tells her she has been fooled. Ironically, Nanashi appears to Halmina to reveal that she is indeed a Miina.

Rabbit Force
A Getsumen To Heiki Miina, also known as a Miina or Rabbit Warrior, is a rabbit-themed mahō shōjo whose powers pass from mother to daughter. The idea of Miinas originated in Japan (due to Japan's mythology of rabbits), but it is shown that Miinas are worldwide. The Miinas are governed by the Miina Legion. They create rules and regulations regarding a Miina's position. A Miina have her powers evicted if she uses her powers for her own personal gain, resulting in being given the label "Rogue Miina". A Miina has a thematic food (typically produce) which she uses to transform by consuming the food and evoking "Ju-Jytsu". When a Miina transforms, she will gain pink/red eyes and sometimes other physical changes. Because of this, the powers of a Miina are believed to be genetic. A Miina defends herself with a high-tech machine that takes the overall image of her given thematic food. The machine can be changed into a weapon or tool that the Miina chooses. The machine attaches at the Miina's signature "triple tail"(two large rabbit tails attached by a small rabbit tail in between.) Because the machine most likely come in pairs, they attach at the two large tails.

The alter ego of Mina Tsukuda. Tsukishiro Miina's thematic food is carrots, thus she obtains two high-tech machines that look like carrots. She typically uses them as jet packs for flight or a hammer for defense. As a running gag, she hates carrots and grimaces in disgust whenever she uses them to transform. Her Miina costume consists of a white, short-sleeved belly shirt, black mini skirt, blue heels and red gloves. In the Densha Otoko series, the pattern of her tail was reversed; having one large rabbit tail in the middle with two smaller tails at the sides.

The alter ego of Suiren Koshu. Her thematic food is beets, thus she obtains two high-tech machines in the appearance of beets. She often uses them as clubs or a baton. It's assumed she is a Rogue Miina because of her single tail and the fact that her weapons are not shown to be launched from the moon base. So rather than being attached to a triple tail, the beet-weapons typically float above her or she carries them. But mention of her being a Rogue was unheard. Her Miina costume consists of a black full body suit with an open zipper down the middle and thick purple boots and gloves. She is the only Miina whose physical appearance changes, her feminine caramel-colored bun is changed to a dark brown boyish cut (representing her personality change in alter egos) Her face also appears more masculine as well. When she attacks an alien, she'll go to extreme lengths to stop it. Often in the process she causes destruction, prompting the theory that she's a Rogue Miina due to this behavior.

The alter ego of Nakoru Hazemi. Minazuki Miina's thematic food is tomatoes, giving her two high-tech machines in the appearance of tomatoes, she also has a small tomato baton. She is shown to use the machines as a bomb launcher. Her Miina costume is a short-sleeved school uniform (which is noted to look almost identical to her typical school uniform) with red shoes and two brown belts.

The alter ego of Yuu Takanashi. Her thematic food is cherries, thus she gains a pair of high tech machines that look like cherries. She uses them as bomb launchers. Unlike the others, she has no rabbit tail, rather the cherry-weapons attach to her head band. Her Miina costume is a school uniform with a jacket, red jet pack, and dress shoes. She is shown to echo Minazuki Miina's overall appearance.

The alter ego of Tsutsuji Sanae. Her transformation is activated by blueberries. She is a Rogue Miina. It has been hinted that she used her Miina powers to obtain an antique war craft item, resulting in having her powers evicted. Nanashi later gives her Miina powers back. But because she is a Rogue Miina she doesn't get an official Miina weapon. She gets a bazooka, which she is shown to being to conjure whenever she can in her Miina form. As a result, she has only a single rabbit tail. Her Miina costume consists of a camouflage tank top, black shorts, blue boots, black fingerless gloves and two blue sleeves on her fore arms.

The alter ego of Sumire Nishiha. Her thematic food is a potato. But her high-tech machines are in a chain-like form and do not take the form of a potato. She isn't seen using them as a weapon or tool. When she first transforms, she has a single tail. But when her machines are fired from her private jets-rather than the moon base-a triple rabbit tail appears. The tail pattern, however, is reversed. She is the only Miina whose weapons not only attach to her tail but also her collar. It's assumed that because she's part of the Miina Legion, she differs greatly from the other Miinas. Her Miina outfit is a black, short sleeve, belly shirt with a large puffy collar, denim shorts, black boots and multi-colored scrunchies on her wrists.

Shiwasu Miina's assistant. She has a Miina form but her thematic food, weapon, and transformation not displayed. Her Miina costume consists of a pink layered fluffy poncho, and white boots.

In pedestrian form, she works at a restaurant. Her Miina costume is a long white gown, red gloves and black dress shoes. Her transformation sequence is not shown.

In pedestrian form, she works at the restaurant. She wears a black leather jacket and a large green and white skirt. Her transformation sequence is not shown.

The alter ego of Halmina Goldberg. Her thematic food is corn, so she obtains two high-tech machines in the form of ears of corn. Her Miina costume consists of an orange kimono-like shirt, black thongs, knee-high stockings, dress shoes, and orange gloves. She also has a sword to attack with.

Her thematic food is supposedly cauliflower. Her Miina costume is a green sports bra, crossed shoulder bags, green parachute pants, sandals and fluffy scrunchies on her wrists. Her transformation sequence is not shown. Kisaragi's pedestrian persona is not displayed in the series. She has a ganguro appearance.

The alter ego of Minamo Haibara. Her thematic food is lotus fruit. She is shown to use her two lotus-weapons as missile launchers. Her Miina costume consists of an oversized, long sleeved, gray wool shirt with blue ribbons, black shoes and black pants.

He is a robot that appears as an infant dressed in a peanut/rabbit costume. Whether or not this is his real form or simply a disguise is never discussed.

Episodes

Note: EX-1 and EX-2 are DVD-exclusive episodes.

Theme songs
Opening Theme
"Lights, Camera. Action!" by Halcali
Ending Theme
"Beautiful Story" by Marina Inoue , Yasutaka Nakata

Other appearances
Mina Tsukuda is seen in episodes 33 and 34 of Hayate no Gotoku! as a reporter. In the first episode, she is mostly in the background, though she is seen being chased by a mob, after which she flies overhead in her full battle-ready Mina Tsukishiro persona. In the second episode, she interviews Hayate as he is baking cakes. Director Keiichiro Kawaguchi did both series.

References

External links

Anime television series official website 
Fuji TV website 
English-translation of Densha Otoko ver. of Getsumen To Heiki Mina

Anime spin-offs
Dengeki Comic Gao!
Fictional television shows
Fuji TV original programming
Gonzo (company)
Magical girl anime and manga
Shōnen manga